Southern tree frog may refer to:

 Southern brown tree frog, a frog native to Australia
 Southern foam-nest tree frog, a frog found in Africa
 Southern gray tree frog, a frog found in the United States
 Southern highland tree frog, a frog endemic to Mexico
 Southern laughing tree frog, a frog native to Australia
 Southern leaf green tree frog, a frog native to Australia
 Southern New Guinea tree frog, a frog endemic to Papua New Guinea

Animal common name disambiguation pages